Arjen Anthony Lucassen is a Dutch multi-instrumentalist musician, singer, songwriter and record producer. He is most known as the creator of progressive metal/rock opera Ayreon.

Over the years, Lucassen created various bands and musical projects. Overall, he has released seventeen studio albums in project or bands in which he was the leader and main creative force: two solo albums, eight for Ayreon, one for Ambeon, two for Star One, one for Stream of Passion, one for Guilt Machine, and one for The Gentle Storm. He was the guitarist in two studio albums by rock band Bodine (as Iron Anthony), and in six studio albums by rock band Vengeance, and also released a cover album without any artist credited. Both Bodine, Vengeance and Stream of Passion released albums without Lucassen.

Solo

Studio albums

Cover albums

Ambeon

Studio albums

Singles

Ayreon

Studio albums

Live albums/DVDs

EPs

Singles

Compilation albums

The Gentle Storm

Studio albums

EPs

Guilt Machine

Studio albums

Star One

Studio albums

Live albums/DVDs

Stream of Passion

Studio albums

Live albums/DVDs

Singles

With Bodine

Studio albums

With Vengeance

Studio albums

EPs

Singles

Compilation albums

Guest appearances

References

Discographies of Dutch artists
Rock music discographies
Heavy metal discographies